Toggle Talk (Chinese: Toggle星客驾到) is a Singaporean web series launched in May 2015. It is the first Mandarin web series to be launched on MediaCorp interactive service Toggle, following the closure of xinmsn.

Season 2 (2016) 
A new season of Toggle Talk will begin on 1 June 2016, with new episodes every Wednesday. Ian Fang, Kate Pang, Xu Bin, Ya Hui, Mark Lee, Michelle Chong, Vivian Lai and Shaun Chen are the artistes that will be interviewed.

References

Web talk shows